Karel Nováček was the defending champion, but the second seeded Czech lost in the first round to Andrei Cherkasov. Carlos Costa won in the final 6–1, 6–2, 6–3 against Magnus Gustafsson and captured his third individual title at the ATP Tour.

Seeds
Champion seeds are indicated in bold while text in italics indicates the round in which that seed was eliminated.

Draw

Finals

Section 1

Section 2

External links
 ATP main draw

Singles